Getz is a surname.  Notable people with this surname include:

Arthur Getz (1913-1996), American artist and illustrator
Bernhard Getz (1850–1901), Norwegian judge, professor and politician
Chris Getz (born 1983), American baseball player
Eyvind Getz (1888–1956), Norwegian barrister and politician
Gus Getz (1889–1969), American baseball player
Ileen Getz (1961–2005), American actress
James Lawrence Getz (1821–1891), American politician and newspaper founder
Jane Getz (born 1942), American jazz pianist
John Getz (born 1946), American actor
Kerry Getz (born 1975), American skateboarder
Morton H. Getz (died 1995), American politician
Nicolai Getz (born 1991), Norwegian chess master
Stan Getz (1927–1991), American jazz saxophonist
Stella Getz (born 1977), Norwegian singer
Stuart Getz (born 1953), American actor
Yehuda Getz (1924–1995), Tunisian-born rabbi

Fictional characters
Nate Getz, from the television series NCIS: Los Angeles
Getz (Breaking Bad)

See also
Georgi Georgiev-Getz (1926–1996), Bulgarian actor
Hyundai Getz, a supermini car produced by the Hyundai Motor Company
Mount Getz, a mountain in Antarctica